Gilchrist Stuart (born Derek Grist; 19 January 1919—8 June 1977) was a British actor. He was probably best known for playing Franz, the butler of captain von Trapp in Academy Award winning film The Sound of Music. He was sometimes credited as Gil Stuart.

Biography
He was born in London as Derek Grist. He studied at Royal Academy of Dramatic Arts. He came to Hollywood under contract to Metro Goldwyn Meyer.

Career
Stuart played supporting or minor roles in such films as A Yank in the R.A.F., where he played Wales, Sword in the Desert,Designing Woman, Assault on a Queen, Morituri, Doctor Dolittle. He also appeared in films with his The Sound of Music co-stars: he appeared in Forever Amber and The Lost World  alongside Richard Haydn, and in Star! alongside Julie Andrews. He also appeared as an actor in episode of The Alfred Hitchcock Hour titled A Nice Touch, opposite Anne Baxter and George Segal, as well as in other television shows. He appeared in Red Skelton Show for the period of over 16 years.

His most notable role was in film The Sound of Music, which won five Oscars. He played the butler of captain Georg von Trapp. In the beginning of the film, Maria mistakes him for captain. He was recommended by another member of the film's team and was a familiar face to director Robert Wise, who offered him the role shortly before start of the filming in March of 1964.
In her memoir Forever Liesl: A Memoir of The Sound of Music, Charmian Carr described him as "a marvelous character actor, very reserved", and being part of "British group" of actors on the set.

References

External links
 

1919 births
1977 deaths